The Palisades Bridge, near Garretson, South Dakota, United States, was built in 1908.  Also known as the Palisades State Park Bridge, it is located in Palisades State Park.  It is a pin-connected Pratt truss bridge.  It was listed on the National Register of Historic Places in 1999.

It was manufactured by the Western Bridge & Construction Co.

It was built to replace an original bridge, built in 1883, which was destroyed by an ice jam in 1896. It spans Splitrock Creek across rock cliffs  up from the creek level.

References

National Register of Historic Places in South Dakota
Bridges completed in 1908
Minnehaha County, South Dakota
Bridges in South Dakota